Syllepte sakarahalis is a moth in the family Crambidae. It was described by Hubert Marion and Pierre Viette in 1956. It is endemic to Madagascar.

References

Moths described in 1956
Moths of Madagascar
sakarahalis
Taxa named by Pierre Viette